Hernandia labyrinthica (Carolinian: oschal) is a species of tree in the family Hernandiaceae indigenous to Indonesia, New Guinea, the Solomon Islands, and the islands of Rota and Guam in Micronesia.

References 

Hernandiaceae
Flora of the Mariana Islands
Flora of Micronesia
Flora of Oceania